Gilbert Thomas 'Bert' Thornley (born 3 September 1942) is a former Australian rules footballer who played with Carlton in the VFL.

Football
Thornley, a defender who could kick with both feet, was recruited to Carlton from East Fremantle Football Club in the Western Australian Football League, and made his VFL debut during the 1967 season.

Selected as a resting forward-pocket rover, Thornley played in the 1970 VFL Grand Final. He was replaced, at half-time, by eventual match hero Ted Hopkins.

He finished his playing career at Preston Football Club in the Victorian Football Association (VFA) before becoming the coach of Torquay.

See also
 1966 Hobart Carnival
 1970 VFL Grand Final

References

External links
 Gilbert Thomas "Bert" Thornley, at WAFL Footy Facts
 
 Gilbert Thomas "Bert" Thornley, at The VFA Project
 
 Blueseum profile

1942 births
Australian rules footballers from Western Australia
East Fremantle Football Club players
Carlton Football Club players
Carlton Football Club Premiership players
Preston Football Club (VFA) players
Living people
One-time VFL/AFL Premiership players